Jimmy Mainfroi (born 28 March 1983) is a Réunion-French former professional footballer who played as a right-back.

Career
Mainfroi began his career at the age of fifteen with Montpellier HSC, was promoted to first team in January 2004 and made his professional football debut on 6 March 2004 in the Ligue 2 match with Montpellier against Toulouse F.C. In July 2007, he joined Grenoble Foot 38 on a free transfer, he left also after six years Montpellier. On 30 October 2008, Mainfroi was expected to be out for the rest of the season after undergoing surgery. On 16 January 2012, he signed a three-year contract with Ligue 2 side Amiens SC after being released from Grenoble.

Career statistics

 2003–04 Montpellier HSC, Ligue 1 (11 matches)
 2004–05 Montpellier HSC, Ligue 2 (18 matches)
 2005–06 Montpellier HSC, Ligue 2 (15 matches)
 2006–07 Montpellier HSC, Ligue 2 (16 matches, 1 goal)
 2007–08 Grenoble Foot 38, Ligue 2 (27 matches)
 2008–09 Grenoble Foot 38, Ligue 1 (9 matches)
 2009–10 Grenoble Foot 38, Ligue 1 (14 matches)
 2010–11 Grenoble Foot 38, Ligue 2 (24 matches)
 2011–12 Amiens SC, Ligue 2

References

External links
 
 
 
 
 
 

1983 births
Living people
French people of Réunionnais descent
Black French sportspeople
Sportspeople from Mâcon
French footballers
Footballers from Bourgogne-Franche-Comté
Association football defenders
Ligue 1 players
Ligue 2 players
Montpellier HSC players
Grenoble Foot 38 players
Amiens SC players